Sweden competed at the 1952 Summer Olympics in Helsinki, Finland. 206 competitors, 183 men and 23 women, took part in 124 events in 17 sports.

Medalists

Athletics

Boxing

Canoeing

Cycling

Road Competition
Men's Individual Road Race (190.4 km)
Yngve Lundh — 5:12:15.2 (→ 16th place)
Stig Mårtensson — 5:13:00.0 (→ 18th place)
Allan Carlsson — 5:16:19.1 (→ 21st place)
Lars Nordwall — did not finish (→ no ranking)

Diving

Men's 3m Springboard
Frank Landqvist
 Preliminary Round — 60.11 points (→ 23rd place)

Gunnar Johansson
 Preliminary Round — 59.11 points (→ 27th place)

Equestrian

Fencing

Ten fencers, all men, represented Sweden in 1952.

Men's foil
 Bo Eriksson
 Nils Rydström
 Rolf Magnusson

Men's team foil
 Rolf Magnusson, Sven Fahlman, Nils Rydström, Bo Eriksson

Men's épée
 Per Carleson
 Carl Forssell
 Sven Fahlman

Men's team épée
 Per Carleson, Carl Forssell, Bengt Ljungquist, Berndt-Otto Rehbinder, Sven Fahlman, Lennart Magnusson

Men's sabre
 Henry Nordin
 Bo Eriksson

Football

Summary

Gymnastics

Modern pentathlon

Three male pentathletes represented Sweden in 1952. Lars Hall won gold in the individual event and all three pentathletes won silver in the team event.

Individual
 Lars Hall
 Thorsten Lindqvist
 Claes Egnell

Team
 Lars Hall
 Thorsten Lindqvist
 Claes Egnell

Rowing

Sweden had 16 male rowers participate in four out of seven rowing events in 1952.

Men's double sculls
Tore Johansson
Curt Brunnqvist

Men's coxless pair
Bernt Torberntsson
Evert Gunnarsson

Men's coxed pair
Ove Nilsson
Ingemar Svensson
Lars-Erik Larsson

Men's eight
Lennart Andersson
Frank Olsson
John Niklasson
Gösta Adamsson
Ivan Simonsson
Ragnar Ek
Thore Börjesson
Rune Andersson
Sture Baatz

Sailing

Shooting

Ten shooters represented Sweden in 1952. Sweden won silver and bronze in the trap event and silver in the 100m running deer.

25 m pistol
 Gösta Pihl
 Torsten Ullman

50 m pistol
 Torsten Ullman
 Hugo Lundkvist

300 m rifle, three positions
 Holger Erbén
 Walther Fröstell

50 m rifle, three positions
 Uno Berg
 Walther Fröstell

50 m rifle, prone
 Walther Fröstell
 Uno Berg

100m running deer
 Olof Sköldberg
 Thorleif Kockgård

Trap
 Knut Holmqvist
 Hans Liljedahl

Swimming

Water polo

Summary

Weightlifting

Wrestling

References

External links
Official Olympic Reports
International Olympic Committee results database

Nations at the 1952 Summer Olympics
1952
1952 in Swedish sport